Sathya Sai Baba (born Ratnakaram Sathyanarayana Raju; 23 November 192624 April 2011) was an Indian guru. At the age of fourteen, he claimed that he was the reincarnation of Shirdi Sai Baba, and left his home to serve his devotees.

Sai Baba's believers credited him with miracles such as materialisations of vibhuti (holy ash) and other small objects such as rings, necklaces and watches, along with reports of miraculous healings, resurrections, clairvoyance, bilocation and was allegedly omnipotent and omniscient. Some individuals have concluded that his acts were based on sleight of hand or had other explanations that were not supernatural, although his devotees believe them to be signs of his divinity.

In 1972, Sathya Sai Baba founded the Sri Sathya Sai Central Trust. "to enable its members to undertake service activities as a means to spiritual advancement". Through this organisation, Sathya Sai Baba established a network of free super speciality hospitals and general hospitals, clinics, drinking water projects, a university, auditoriums, ashrams, edtech platforms and schools. It has branches in over 40 countries, run by one of its sister organizations - the Sri Sathya Sai Global Council.

Biography

Early life

Almost everything known about Sathya Sai Baba's early life stems from the hagiography that grew around him, narratives that hold special meaning to his devotees and are considered by them to be evidence of his divine nature. According to these sources, Sathyanarayana Raju was born on 23 November 1926 to Meesaraganda Easwaramma and Peddavenkama Raju Ratnakaram, to a Bhatraju family, a community of religious musicians and balladeers, in the village of Puttaparthi which was the Madras Presidency of British India. His birth was alleged by his mother Easwaramma to be of a miraculous conception. He was the fourth among the five children of his parents.

Sathya Sai Baba's siblings included elder brother Ratnakaram Seshama Raju (1911–1985), elder sisters Venkamma (1918–1993) and Parvathamma (1920–1998), and younger brother Janakiramaiah (1931–2003).

As a child, Sathya was described as "unusually intelligent" and charitable, though not necessarily academically inclined, as his interests were of a more spiritual nature. He was uncommonly talented in devotional music, dance and drama. From a young age, he has been alleged to have been capable of materialising objects such as food and sweets out of thin air.

Proclamation

On 8 March 1940, while living with his elder brother Seshama Raju in Uravakonda, a small town near Puttaparthi, 14-year-old Sathya was allegedly stung by a scorpion. He lost consciousness for several hours and in the next few days underwent a noticeable change in behaviour. There were "symptoms of laughing and weeping, eloquence and silence." It is claimed that then "he began to sing Sanskrit verses, a language of which it is alleged he had no prior knowledge." Doctors concluded his behaviour to be hysteria. Concerned, his parents brought Sathya back home to Puttaparthi and took him to many priests, doctors and exorcists. One of the exorcists at Kadiri, a town near Puttaparthi, went to the extent of torturing him with the aim of curing him.

On 23 May 1940, Sathya called household members and reportedly materialised sugar candy (prasad) and flowers for them. His father became furious at seeing this, thinking his son was bewitched. He took a stick and threatened to beat him if Sathya did not reveal who he really was, the young Sathya responded calmly and firmly "I am Sai Baba", a reference to Sai Baba of Shirdi. This was the first time he proclaimed himself to be the reincarnation of Sai Baba of Shirdia saint who became famous in the late 19th and early 20th centuries in Maharashtra and had died eight years before Sathya was born. It was then he came to be known as 'Sathya Sai Baba'.

First mandir and development of Puttaparthi

In 1944, a mandir for Sai Baba's devotees was built near the village of Puttaparthi. It is now referred to as the "old mandir". The construction of Prasanthi Nilayam, the current ashram, began in 1948 and was completed in 1950. In 1954, Sai Baba established a small free general hospital in the village of Puttaparthi. He won fame for his reputed mystical powers and ability to heal. In 1957, Sai Baba went on a North Indian temple tour.

Stroke, prediction of reincarnation and sole foreign tour

In 1963, it was asserted that Sai Baba suffered a stroke and four severe heart attacks, which left him paralysed on one side. These events culminated in an event where he apparently healed himself in front of the thousands of people gathered in Prashanthi Nilayam who were then praying for his recovery.

On recovering, Sai Baba announced that he would one day next be reborn as an incarnation named Prema Sai Baba in the neighbouring state of Karnataka. He stated, "I am Shiva-Sakthi, born in the gotra (lineage) of Bharadwaja, according to a boon won by that sage from Siva and Sakthi. Siva was born in the gotra of that sage as Sai Baba of Shirdi; Shiva and Sakthi have incarnated as Myself in his gotra now; Sakthi alone will incarnate as the third Sai (Prema Sai Baba) in the same gotra in Mandya district of Karnataka State." He stated he would be born again eight years after his death at the age of 96, but died at the age of 84.

On 29 June 1968, Sai Baba made his only overseas trip, to Kenya and Uganda.

Later years

In 1968, he established Dharmakshetra or the Sathyam Mandir in Mumbai. In 1973, he established the Shivam Mandir in Hyderabad. On 19 January 1981, in Chennai, he inaugurated the Sundaram Mandir.

In a 1993 incident, four intruders armed with knives entered his bedroom, either as an assassination attempt or as part of a power struggle between his followers. Sai Baba was unharmed. During the scuffle and the police response, the intruders and two of Sai Baba's attendants were killed. The official investigation left questions unanswered.

In March 1995, Sai Baba started a project to provide drinking water to 1.2 million people in the drought-prone Rayalaseema region in the Anantapur district of Andhra Pradesh. In April 1999 he inaugurated the Ananda Nilayam Mandir in Madurai, Tamil Nadu.

In 2001 he established another free super-speciality hospital in Bangalore to benefit the poor.

Old age, illness and death

In 2003, Sai Baba suffered a fractured hip when a student standing on an iron stool slipped and the boy and stool both fell on him. After that he gave darshana from a car or his porte chair. After 2004, Sai Baba used a wheelchair and began to make fewer public appearances.

On 28 March 2011, Sai Baba was admitted to the Sri Sathya Sai Super Speciality Hospital, named after and started by himself,
at Prasanthigram at Puttaparthi, following respiration-related problems. After nearly a month of hospitalisation, during which his condition progressively deteriorated, he died on Sunday, 24 April at 7:40 IST, aged 84.

Sai Baba had predicted that he would die at age 96 and would remain healthy until then. After he died, some devotees suggested that he was referring to that many lunar years, as counted by Telugu-speaking Hindus, rather than solar years, and using the Indian way of accounting for age, which counts the year to come as part of the person's life. Other devotees have spoken of his anticipated resurrection, reincarnation or awakening.

Funeral and mourning

His body lay in state for two days and was buried with full state honours on 27 April 2011. An estimated 500,000 people attended the burial. Political leaders and prominent figures attending included then Indian Prime Minister Manmohan Singh, Congress president Sonia Gandhi, Gujarat Chief Minister Narendra Modi (who later became Prime Minister of India), cricketer Sachin Tendulkar and Union Ministers S. M. Krishna and Ambika Soni.

Political leaders who offered their condolences included the then Indian Prime Minister Manmohan Singh, then Nepali Prime Minister Jhala Nath Khanal, Sri Lankan President Mahinda Rajapaksa and the Dalai Lama. Cricketer Sachin Tendulkar, whose birthday was that day, cancelled his birthday celebrations. The Hindu newspaper reported that "Sri Sathya Sai Baba's propagation of spiritualism and preaching of Hindu philosophy never came in the way of his commitment to secular beliefs."

The Government of Karnataka declared 25 and 26 April as days of mourning and Andhra Pradesh declared 25, 26, and 27 April as days of mourning.

Sathya Sai Organisation

The Sathya Sai Organisation (or Sri Sathya Sai Seva Organization) was founded in the 1960s by Sathya Sai Baba. Initially called the "Sri Sathya Sai Seva Samithi", it was established "to enable its members to undertake service activities as a means to spiritual advancement." In 2020, Sri Satya Sai Central Trust was granted Special Consultative status by United Nations Economic and Social Council

The Sathya Sai Organisation reports that there are an estimated 1,200 Sathya Sai Baba Centres in 114 countries. However, the number of active Sai Baba followers is hard to determine. Estimates vary from 6 million up to nearly 100 million. In India itself, Sai Baba drew followers predominantly from the upper-middle-class, the urban sections of society who have the "most wealth, education and exposure to Western ideas." In 2002, he claimed to have followers in 178 countries.

Sathya Sai Baba founded a large number of schools and colleges, hospitals, and other charitable institutions in India and abroad, the net financial capital of which is usually estimated at  400 billion (US$9 billion). However, estimates as high as  1.4 trillion (about US$31.5bn) have also been made.

After his death, questions about the manner in which the finances of the organisation were going to be managed led to speculations of impropriety, with some reports suggesting that suitcases containing cash and/or gold had been removed from his personal lodgings.

On 17 June 2011, officials from the Sri Sathya Sai Central Trust opened his private residence in the presence of government, bank and tax department officials. In the private residence, which had been sealed since his death, they inventoried 98 kg of gold ornaments, approximate value Rs 21 crores (US$4.7m), 307 kg of silver ornaments, approximate value Rs 16 million (US$0.36m), and Rs 116 million (US$2.6m) in cash. The cash was deposited into the Sai Trust's account at the State Bank of India with payment of government taxes (thus transferring them from religious gifts to Trust assets.) The gold and other items were inventoried, assessed, and placed in secure storage. In July, district authorities inventoried an additional Rs 7.7 million (US$0.17m) in valuables in another 4 rooms. The total value of these items is believed to exceed 7.8 million US dollars. Also inventoried at Yajurmandir were thousands of pure silk sarees, dhotis, shirts, 500 pairs of shoes, dozens of bottles of perfume and hairspray, watches, a large number of silver and gold "mangala sutrams", and precious stones such as diamonds. There were also 750 saffron and white robes of the type Sai Baba wore. In July 2011, a similar opening of his Bangalore-area ashram tallied 6 kg of gold coins and jewellery, 245 kg of silver articles and Rs 8 million in cash. These items and goods are believed to have been donated over the years by Sai Baba's devotees from all over the world as religious gifts.

Recognition

On 23 November 1999, the Department of Posts, Government of India, released a postage stamp and a postal cover in recognition of the service rendered by Sai Baba in addressing the problem of providing safe drinking water to the rural masses. Another commemorative stamp was released on the occasion of what would have been his 88th birthday during November 2013.

In January 2007, an event was held in Chennai Nehru Stadium organised by the Chennai Citizens' Conclave to thank Sai Baba for the 2 billion water project which brought water from the River Krishna in Andhra Pradesh to Chennai city. Four chief ministers attended the function.

Ashrams and mandirs

Prasanthi Nilayam

Puttaparthi, where Sai Baba was born and lived, was originally a small, remote South Indian village in Andhra Pradesh. Now there is an extensive university complex, a speciality hospital, and two museums: the Sanathana Samskruti or Eternal Heritage Museum, sometimes called the Museum of All Religions, and the Chaitanya Jyoti, devoted exclusively to the life and teachings of Sai Baba; the latter has won several international awards for its architectural design. There is also a planetarium, a railway station, a hill-view stadium, an administrative building, an airport, an indoor sports stadium and more. High-ranking Indian politicians such as the former president A. P. J. Abdul Kalam, former prime minister Atal Bihari Vajpayee, Andhra Pradesh former chief minister Konijeti Rosaiah and Karnataka chief minister B. S. Yediyurappa have been official guests at the ashram in Puttaparthi. It was reported that well over a million people attended Sai Baba's 80th birthday celebration, including 13,000 delegates from India and 180 other countries.

Sai Baba resided much of the time in his main ashram, Prasanthi Nilayam (Abode of Highest Peace), at Puttaparthi. In the summer he often left for his other ashram, Brindavan, in Kadugodi, Whitefield, a town on the outskirts of Bangalore. Occasionally he visited his Sai Sruthi ashram in Kodaikanal.

Characteristics, beliefs and practices of devotees

Reliable sources often describe Sai Baba's following as a "movement". A report from the Central Intelligence Agency (CIA) in 1998 found that "[a] worldwide mass religious movement is growing around the Indian holy man and alleged miracle worker, Sathya Sai Baba, whose devotees regard him as the full incarnation of God", later noting that "India has a small industry of fake holy men who perform magic tricks for a living". Scholars often refer to it as either a "New Religious Movement" (NRM) or as a cult, reflecting what Robbins and Zablocki, two social science researchers, call "the divisive polarization, which, at least until recently, has plagued the academic study of religious movements." between two camps within academia, each preferring one term over the other (i.e. NRM or cult) for such groups. It has been noted by Eugene Gallagher, a noted professor of religious studies, that in more modern times "'New Religious Movement', is the classification preferred by most academics, who see 'cult' as a pejorative term. Sai Baba's following is regarded by most scholars to be of Hindu persuasion.

Sai Baba claimed to be the reincarnation of Sai Baba of Shirdi, and his followers considered him to be the Avatar of Shiva. Sai Baba of Shirdi was known to combine Islamic and Hindu teachings; still Charles S. J. White, of The American University at Washington D.C., noted of Sathya Sai Baba in 1972, that "there is no discernible Muslim influence." Stephanie Tallings, in The Harvard international Review, noted Sai Baba's following is drawn from people of all religions, ethnicities, and social classes. Lawrence A. Babb, of the Amherst College in Massachusetts, labelled Sai Baba movement as a cult in the 1980s, calling it "deeply and authentically Hindu..." and noted, "The most striking feature of this cult, however, is the extremely strong emphasis given to the miraculous." However, a scholarly review claims Babb misapplies the word “cult”, responding, "the so-called 'cult' of Satya Sai Baba seems to possess all such characteristics which are, according to the author, central to a religious movement." Deborah A. Swallow, of the University of Cambridge, referred to it as a cult and said that the "ritual and theology, then, unlike Sai Baba [of Shirdi]'s, is distinctly Hindu in form and content." But John D. Kelly, a professor of anthropology at the University of Chicago, wrote about Hindu missions in Fiji that the Sathya Sai Organization (which is part of the movement) rejected the label Hindu. According to Kelly, they see their founder as the "living synthesis of the world's religious traditions" and prefer to be classified as an interfaith movement. But he observed that Sai Baba mission is a Hindu mission as active as Christian or Muslim missions. In a 2001 scholarly book, Tulasi Srinivas notes, "The Sathya Sai global civil religious movement incorporates Hindu and Muslim practices, Buddhist, Christian, and Zoroastrian influences, and "New Age"-style rituals and beliefs.’ And in the appendix of the book (p. 349) lists 10 scholarly authors/researchers in both Europe and America who all refer to it as a New Religious Movement (NRM).

Sai Baba was known for his quote "Love All, Serve All. Help Ever, Hurt Never." Internationally, his devotees gather daily, or weekly on Sundays or Thursdays or both, for devotional songs, prayer, spiritual meditation, service to the community (Seva), and to participate in "Education in Human Values" (SSEHV) known as "Bal Vikas" (Blossoming of the Child).

Followers believed in seeking the spiritual benefit of Sai Baba's darshan, scheduled for morning and afternoon each day. Sai Baba would interact with people, accept letters or call groups or individuals for interviews. Devotees considered it a great privilege to have an interview and sometimes a single person, group or family was invited for a private interview for answers to spiritual questions and general guidance.

Sai Baba was a lacto-vegetarian for ethical and spiritual reasons and his followers have adopted the diet. He stated that "meat eating fosters animal qualities in man making him descend to the demoniac level; it is a heart-rending sight to see cows being slaughtered to serve as food for man." Sai Baba and his followers have heavily criticized factory farming as unethical.

The Vancouver Sun in 2001 reported that Sai Baba told his adherents not to browse the internet.

Criticism

Accusations 
Accusations against Sathya Sai Baba by his critics over the years have included sleight of hand, sexual abuse, money laundering, fraud in the performance of service projects, and murder.

In 1972, Abraham Kovoor made the first public criticism of Sathya Sai Baba when he looked into a claim publicly narrated by one devotee that Sai Baba had created a new model of a Seiko watch, and found the claim to be untrue.

In April 1976, Hossur Narasimhaiah, a physicist, rationalist and then vice-chancellor of Bangalore University, founded and chaired a committee "to rationally and scientifically investigate miracles and other verifiable superstitions". Narasimhaiah wrote Sai Baba three widely publicised letters challenging him to perform his miracles under controlled conditions. The letters were ignored. Sathya Sai Baba said that he ignored Narasimhaiah's challenge because he felt that a scientific approach to spiritual issues was improper, adding that "Science must confine its inquiry only to things belonging to the human senses, while spiritualism transcends the senses. If you want to understand the nature of spiritual power you can do so only through the path of spirituality and not science. What science has been able to unravel is merely a fraction of the cosmic phenomena..." Narasimhaiah's committee was dissolved in August 1977. Narasimhaiah held the fact that Sai Baba ignored his letters to be an indication that his miracles were fraudulent. As a result of this episode, a public debate raged for several months in Indian newspapers.

Indian rationalist Basava Premanand, who began campaigning against Sathya Sai Baba in 1976, unsuccessfully attempted to sue him in 1986 for violations of the Gold Control Act, citing Sai Baba's purported materialisations of gold objects. When the case was dismissed, Premanand unsuccessfully appealed on the grounds that claimed spiritual power is not a defence recognised in law.

A 1995 TV documentary Guru Busters, produced by filmmaker Robert Eagle for the UK's Channel 4, accused Sai Baba of faking his materialisations. The clip from the film was mentioned in the Deccan Chronicle, on 23 November 1992, in a front-page headline "DD Tape Unveils Baba Magic".

Claims of Sai Baba resurrecting American devotee Walter Cowan in 1971 have been discussed by British journalist Mick Brown in his book The Spiritual Tourist from 1998,  and subsequently by Erlendur Haraldsson, who interviewed doctors attending Cowan at the hospital; these physicians reported that Cowan had been dangerously ill but had not died.

Brown also related his experiences with the alleged manifestations of vibhuti from Sai Baba's pictures in houses in London, which he felt were not fraudulent or the result of trickery. Brown wrote with regards to Sai Baba's claims of omniscience, that "sceptics have produced documentation clearly showing discrepancies between Baba's reading of historical events and biblical prophecies, and the established accounts."

Allegations of abuse
In January 2002, a documentary produced by Denmark's national television and radio broadcast company, Danmarks Radio (DR), called Seduced By Sai Baba, analysed videos of public manifestations of Sai Baba and suggested that they could be explained as sleight of hand. The documentary also presented interviews with Alaya Rahm, former devotee of Sathya Sai Baba, where he alleged abuse by Sathya Sai Baba. As a result, in 2002 the parliament of the United Kingdom discussed the danger to male children of British families intending to visit the ashram of Sathya Sai Baba in case of individual audiences with the guru.

In 2004, the BBC produced a documentary titled The Secret Swami as part of its series "The World Uncovered". One central theme of the BBC documentary was again Alaya Rahm's sexual abuse allegations against Sathya Sai Baba. This documentary interviewed him together with Mark Roche, who had spent 25 years of his life since 1969 in the movement and alleged abuse by Sai Baba. The show also featured allegations from Sai Baba critic Basava Premanand. Premanand stated in the documentary that, in his opinion, Sai Baba faked his materialisations.

Responses
Sathya Sai Baba rejected any allegations of misconduct. In a speech he held in December 2000, he compared himself to Jesus Christ and his detractors to Judas Iscariot, claiming that they were motivated by jealousy. His followers have also defended him publicly. These include Bill Aitken, and Anil Kumar, former principal of the Sathya Sai Educational Institute.

In an open letter in December 2001, Prime Minister Atal Bihari Vajpayee, Chief Justices P. N. Bhagwati and Ranganath Misra, and Members of Parliament and Najma Heptulla said that they were "deeply pained and anguished by the wild, reckless and concocted allegations" against Sathya Sai Baba, and called him "an embodiment of love and selfless service to humanity".

References

Further reading

External links

 International Sai Organization
 
 
 

 
1926 births
2011 deaths
Founders of new religious movements
Indian Hindu spiritual teachers
Indian vegetarianism activists
People from Anantapur district
People from Rayalaseema
People considered avatars by their followers
Puttaparthi
Psychokineticists
Religious pluralism
Self-declared messiahs
Tantra
21st-century Indian philanthropists
Tantric practices
Telugu people
Burials in India
Modern yoga gurus